As Long as There's Music is an album of duets by bassist Charlie Haden and pianist Hampton Hawes recorded in 1976 and released on the Artists House label in 1978. The 1993 CD reissue added a bonus track originally released on The Golden Number and three alternative takes from the recording sessions.

Reception 
The Allmusic review by Scott Yanow awarded the album 4 stars, stating, "This quiet and often lyrical set contains a great deal of thoughtful and subtle music by two masters".

Track listing 
All compositions by Charlie Haden and Hampton Hawes except where noted.
 "Irene" (Hampton Hawes) – 7:58
 "Rain Forest" (Hawes) – 5:34
 "Turnaround" (Ornette Coleman) – 7:52 Bonus track on CD reissue
 "As Long as There's Music" (Sammy Cahn, Jule Styne) – 8:11
 "This Is Called Love" - 9:12
 "Hello/Goodbye" - 8:05
 "Irene" (Hawes) – 8:39 Bonus track on CD reissue
 "Turnaround" (Coleman) – 6:35 Bonus track on CD reissue
 "As Long as There's Music" (Cahn, Styne) – 7:32 Bonus track on CD reissue
Recorded at Kendun Recorders in Burbank, California on January 25, 1976 (tracks 1, 6 & 7) and at Village Recorder in Los Angeles on August 21, 1976 (tracks 2–5, 8 & 9)

Personnel 
Charlie Haden – bass
Hampton Hawes – piano

References 

Artists House albums
Charlie Haden albums
Hampton Hawes albums
1978 albums